VOCM-FM is a Canadian radio station broadcasting at 97.5 MHz from St. John's, Newfoundland and Labrador. Owned by Stingray Group, the station is branded as 97.5 K-Rock and broadcasts a classic rock format, although some 1990s and 2000s rock songs have recently become part of the mix.

History
Originally launched in September 1982, it was called VO Stereo and later as 97.5 VOFM and in the mid-1990s as Magic 97.

After a limited success with its easy listening format in the early 1980s as VO Stereo, a management decision was undertaken to pursue a younger audience.

The late 1980s under the direction of manager Gary Butler and music Director Pat Murphy, the station began programming a mix of new and classic rock with great success. In less than two years, the station vaulted from last place to the number one FM station in St. John's with a predominantly young male audience. Although pleased with the results, management set about to build a stronger audience that would include more female listeners.

In 1990, Celebration Saturdays was introduced to station listeners. It was a three-hour block of party-themed music sponsored by Bender's On George, a local nightclub, hosted by Mike Campbell and later Mike Thomas (Mickey T). Its success led to the creation of the Celebration Roadshow on Friday nights starting in the summer of 1996. Celebration Saturdays was the last show aired on "Magic" before the switch to 97.5 K-Rock.

K-Rock (2002-present)
By early 2002, soon after Newcap bought the VOCM stations from the Butler family, its audience had apparently dipped enough that Newcap changed the format to classic rock, a format where research indicated untapped potential. Sure enough, it soon became the top-rated FM station in the St. John's market. Unexpectedly, much of its audience came from country station CKIX-FM, also a Newcap property. It was enough that this station was promptly reformatted as well; it became a Top 40/CHR station, serving much of the audience lost after the end of "Magic". The first song ever played on "K-Rock" was "Layla", by Derek and the Dominos.

On Sundays from 8am to 1pm, The Homebrew Show hosted by Sam Whiffen plays traditional Newfoundland, Celtic and Irish music not only on this station, but on all other K-Rock stations throughout the province. Other K-Rock shows heard provincewide include K-Rock Mornings with Campbell, Candice & JLaC on weekday mornings and Saturday in Big Tom's Shed hosted by JLaC.

Rebroadcasters
The sole rebroadcaster of the station is VOCM-FM-1 Clarenville, which broadcasts at 100.7 MHz, although three other Stingray stations in the province (CKXD-FM Gander, CKXG-FM Grand Falls-Windsor and CKXX-FM Corner Brook) also feature the K-Rock brand and format.

Unusual callsign
VOCM-FM is one of two Canadian FM stations with a call sign beginning with the ITU prefix "VO". VOCM-FM and its sister station VOCM are among just four radio stations in Canada still bearing call signs beginning with "VO" (the other two being VOAR and VOWR), issued to the Dominion of Newfoundland before its confederation into Canada in 1949. VOCM-FM first went on the air in 1982, well after Newfoundland became a Canadian province. But it took the historic callsign of its sister station VOCM, which FM stations in Canada may do, by adding the "-FM" suffix.

References

External links 
 K-Rock

Radio stations in St. John's, Newfoundland and Labrador
Classic rock radio stations in Canada
Stingray Group radio stations
Radio stations established in 1982
1982 establishments in Canada